Tre'Von Johnson (born February 10, 1995) is a former American football linebacker. He played college football at Weber State University.

Early years
Johnson attended Hunter High School, where he was a two-way play at running back and safety. As a senior, he registered 98 carries for 633 yards, 11 touchdowns and 2 interceptions. He earned second-team All-region and 5A honorable-mention All-state honors.

He accepted a football scholarship from Weber State University. As a freshman, he 38 tackles (14 solo) and 2 tackles for loss. The next year he started in 11 games at safety, recording 62 tackles (fourth on the team), 3.5 tackles for loss, one quarterback pressure and one pass defensed. Against Portland State University, he had 14 tackles (seven solo).

As a junior, he was moved to linebacker, tallying 10 starts, 66 tackles (fourth on the team),4.5 sacks (sixth in the conference), 9.5 tackles for loss (eighth in the conference). Against the University of Montana, he had 13 tackles and 1.5 tackles for loss.

As a senior, he posted 92 tackles, 4.5 sacks (led the team), 12.5 tackles for loss (sixth in the conference). Against the University of South Dakota, he made 15 tackles.

Professional career

Arizona Cardinals
Johnson signed the Arizona Cardinals as an undrafted free agent on May 2, 2017. He was waived by the Cardinals on September 2.

Dallas Cowboys
On September 27, 2017, Johnson was signed to the Dallas Cowboys' practice squad. On December 26, he was promoted to the active roster to secure his rights for the 2018 season.

On September 1, 2018, Johnson was waived by the Cowboys.

Seattle Seahawks
On September 14, 2018, Johnson was signed to the Seattle Seahawks' practice squad, but was released four days later.

Los Angeles Chargers
On October 10, 2018, Johnson was signed to the Los Angeles Chargers practice squad. He was promoted to the active roster on November 13, 2018. He was waived on December 13, 2018 and re-signed to the practice squad. He signed a reserve/future contract with the Chargers on January 14, 2019.

On August 2, 2019, Johnson was waived/injured by the Chargers and placed on injured reserve. He was released on December 5, 2019.

References

External links
Weber State Wildcats bio

1995 births
Living people
People from West Valley City, Utah
Players of American football from Utah
American football linebackers
Weber State Wildcats football players
Arizona Cardinals players
Dallas Cowboys players
Seattle Seahawks players
Los Angeles Chargers players
Johnson, Tre'Von, the retired football player is now having a normal life married, has kids, growing up.